Asian Highway 82 (AH82) is a road in the Asian Highway Network running 1265 km (785 miles) from Sochi, Russia to Ivughli, Iran. The route is as follows:

Russia
: Sochi

Georgia 
(under  control)  S-1 Highway: Leselidze - Sukhumi - Gali
 S-1 Highway: Zugdidi - Senaki - Khashuri
 S-8 Highway: Khashuri - Akhaltsikhe
 S-11 Highway: Akhaltsikhe -Ninotsminda

Armenia
 : Bavra - Gyumri
: Gyumri - Akhurik
 : Gyumri - Ashtarak - Yerevan
 : Yerevan - Yeraskh - Goris - Kapan - Meghri - Agarak

Iran
 : Nurduz - Jolfa
 : Jolfa - Ivughli

References

External links 

 Iran road map on Young Journalists Club

Asian Highway Network
Roads in Georgia (country)
Roads in Armenia
Roads in Iran